"New God Flow" is a song by American rappers Kanye West and Pusha T. It was released as the third single from the compilation album Cruel Summer (2012), a collaboration between members of their record label GOOD Music. Produced by West, Anthony Kilhoffer and Boogz & Tapez, "New God Flow", which is a hip hop song, incorporates numerous samples into its arrangement. It features lines by Pusha T directed at American rapper and record producer Birdman. American rapper Ghostface Killah, whose song "Mighty Healthy" is prominently sampled in the song, is featured on an alternate version entitled "New God Flow.1" that appears on Cruel Summer. West and Pusha T performed "New God Flow" on several occasions, including the 2012 BET Awards and Jay-Z's Made in America Festival. The song was awarded Best Beat at the XXL Awards.

Composition
The song's hook is made from a vocal sample of "Mighty Healthy" as performed by Ghostface Killah, which was also later sampled by Madlib  in Kanye's 2016 Kendrick Lamar-featured single "No More Parties in LA" from his album The Life of Pablo. The main sample used in the song is a piano riff from Marcos Valle's "Bodas De Sangue", from his 1971 album Vento Sul. The drum break in the track is sampled from "Synthetic Substitution" by Melvin Bliss. In the outro, Kanye references the "I don't know, but I've been told" military cadence.

On the album version, there is a verse by the Wu-Tang Clan member (who is sampled on the original version) replacing Kanye West's GOOD Music chant.

Artwork
On June 27, 2012, West's website was updated for the cover art for "New God Flow". The artwork is styled in black and red, with it revealing track info and key participants. The cover art is nearly identical to that of the GOOD Music single "Mercy" that was released earlier in 2012.

Reception
In comparison to the live performance of it at the 2012 BET Awards, Nathan Reese of Refinery29 viewed the song as what "manages a similarly intense effect, letting Pusha T and Kanye West maintain all the anger and vulnerability they showed at that show". Complex listed the song at #34 on their list of the 50 best songs of 2012. At the XXL Awards in 2013, "New God Flow" won the award for Best Beat.

Lyrical content
Pusha T confirmed in October 2012 that within the song, he was responding to a Birdman interview where the rapper dissed GOOD Music. West raps the pair of lines: "Hold up, I ain't tryna stunt, man/But the Yeezys jumped over the Jumpman", referencing the popularity of his Nike Air Yeezy shoes in comparison to that of the Air Jordan brand. The second line was span in his 2015 promotional single "Facts" to: "Yeezy, Yeezy, Yeezy just jumped over Jumpman".

Live performances
At the 2012 BET Awards, Kanye West, Big Sean, Pusha T and 2 Chainz performed their hit single "Mercy", followed by West delivering a solo performance of his single "Cold" and then an a cappella version of his verse on "New God Flow", marking the very first preview of the song.

On July 7, 2012, Kanye West performed "New God Flow" alongside Pusha T as the first performance together of the song in Atlantic City, New Jersey.

On September 1, 2012, Kanye West & Pusha T performed "New God Flow" during their surprise G.O.O.D. Music set at Jay-Z's Made In America Festival, accompanied by Big Sean. The set also included performances of "I Don't Like (Remix)", "Can't Tell Me Nothing" & "Dance (A$$)".

Commercial performance
"New God Flow" performed best on the Canadian Hot 100, charting at position number 66. The song peaked at number 89 on the US Billboard Hot 100.

Charts

References

2012 singles
Pusha T songs
Kanye West songs
GOOD Music singles
Songs written by Kanye West
Song recordings produced by Kanye West
Songs written by Pusha T
Songs with music by Marcos Valle
Songs written by Ghostface Killah
2012 songs